James Pohlad (born March 10, 1953) is an American businessman who is the chairman and part-owner of the Minnesota Twins of the American League. He oversees team operations on behalf of the rest of his family, who owns the whole franchise. He is the son of businessman Carl Pohlad, who made the family's fortune and originally purchased the Minnesota Twins in the 1980s.

Chairman and part-owner of the Minnesota Twins

Since Carl's death on January 5, 2009, Jim and his two brothers, Bill (a film director and producer) and Bob, inherited the Twins franchise; all three serve on the team's executive board. The Twins front-office directory lists the Pohlad family as a whole as the owner of the team, but Jim serves as the ownership group's public face, handling day-to-day operations and representing the Twins at owners meetings. This structure is roughly analogous to that of the NFL's Kansas City Chiefs since the death of founding owner Lamar Hunt in 2006; ownership is vested collectively in his family, but eldest son Clark serves as CEO and operating head of the franchise.

In 2022, Pohlad transitioned control of the Twins to his nephew, Joe Pohlad.

References

External links
Minnesota Twins owners

Living people
Major League Baseball owners
Minnesota Twins owners
American people of Slovak descent
1953 births